Sacajawea and Jean-Baptiste is a bronze sculpture of Sacagawea and Jean Baptiste Charbonneau by American artist Alice Cooper, located in Washington Park in Portland, Oregon, in the United States.

Description
Sacajawea and Jean-Baptiste, designed by Alice Cooper (1875–1937), is an outdoor bronze sculpture, located in Washington Park in Portland, Oregon. It depicts Sacagawea, the Lemhi Shoshone woman who accompanied the Lewis and Clark Expedition during their exploration of the Western United States, with her son Jean Baptiste Charbonneau. The statue measures  x  x .

History

The sculpture was commissioned for the Lewis and Clark Centennial Exposition (1905) by the Committee of Portland Women, who requested a sculpture of "the only woman in the Lewis and Clark Expedition and in honor of the pioneer mother of old Oregon." Funding sources included the Port of Portland and Women for Lewis and Clark Exposition, which was supported by women across the Western United States. The sculpture was unveiled on July 6, 1905 and originally stood in the center of the exposition's plaza. Suffragists present at the dedication included Susan B. Anthony, Abigail Scott Duniway and Anna Howard Shaw. The statue was relocated to Washington Park on April 6, 1906, upon the fair's completion. According to the Regional Arts & Culture Council, which administers the sculpture, Cooper was the first female artist to be represented in Portland's public sculpture collection.

See also

 1905 in art
 Lewis and Clark Exposition dollar
 Lewis and Clark (sculpture), Salem, Oregon

References

External links

 
 Sacajawea, (sculpture). at the Smithsonian Institution
 Sacajawea and Jean-Baptiste at the Public Art Archive
 View of a statue of Sacajawea and Jean-Baptiste at the Digital Public Library of America

1905 establishments in Oregon
1905 sculptures
Bronze sculptures in Oregon
Jean-Baptiste
Monuments and memorials in Portland, Oregon
Monuments and memorials to explorers
Monuments and memorials to women
Outdoor sculptures in Portland, Oregon
Relocated buildings and structures in Oregon
Sculptures of children in Oregon
Sculptures of Native Americans in Oregon
Sculptures of women in Oregon
Statues in Portland, Oregon
Washington Park (Portland, Oregon)
World's fair sculptures
Lewis and Clark Centennial Exposition